Chandrasekhar Billavara is a poker player who won a World Series of Poker bracelet in a $1,500 No-Limit Hold'em event.

Billavara competes in a weekly home game with friends. He jokes that he looks forward to confronting his friends by stating, “Now, I will look at them and say – are you trying to bluff me? Are you crazy? Look at this gold bracelet on my wrist! You want to try [to] bluff me?” 

As of 2010, Billavara had tournament winnings of over $740,000. His three cashes at the WSOP accounted for $734,607 of those winnings.

World Series of Poker bracelets

References

Year of birth missing (living people)
Living people
American poker players
World Series of Poker bracelet winners